Merchant's Tire and Auto falls under the acquisition of Tire Kingdom by TBC Corporation. There are approximately 120 stores nationwide as of 7/17/2015.

History
Founded in 1943, the Merchant family from Manassas, VA owned and operated the first retail stores for Merchant's Tire and Auto. Over the next decades, the company expanded along the East Coast. In the year 2003, Tire Kingdom purchased National Tire & Battery (NTB) and Merchant's Tire & Automotive Service.

Services 
Merchant's Tire and Auto Center specializes in Fluid Services (Oil Changes, Brake Fluid Exchange, Coolant Exchange, and Transmission Fluid Exchange), Battery Services, Wiper Blades, Brake Services, Steering & Suspension Services, and Vehicle Inspections.

See also 
 Big O Tires
 Midas
 Tire Kingdom
 National Tire and Battery

References

External links
Merchant's Tire and Auto
TBC Corporation

TBC Corporation
American companies established in 1943
Retail companies established in 1943
Automotive repair shops of the United States
Companies based in Palm Beach County, Florida
1943 establishments in Virginia